Statistics of Division 2 in the 1982/1983 season.

Overview
It was contested by 36 teams, and Stade Rennais and Toulon won the championship.

League tables

Group A

Group B

Championship play-offs

|}

Promotion play-offs

|}
Nîmes was qualified to the play-off against 18th placed team of Division 1, Tours.

Top goalscorers

References
France - List of final tables (RSSSF)

Ligue 2 seasons
French
2